The 2008 regional elections of Venezuela were held on 23 November 2008 to choose 22 governors and 2 metropolitan mayors. The candidates were selected for a term beginning in 2008 and ending in 2012, when the next regional elections will be held. The 2008 regional elections were the second during the government of Hugo Chávez Frías and the first since he founded the United Socialist Party.

The government of the state of Amazonas and nine municipalities were not chosen in this elections because they had been elected after the 2004 regional elections. The Venezuelan opposition managed to attain the metropolitan municipality of Caracas, won by candidate Antonio Ledezma, as well as five state governments; the United Socialist Party, meanwhile, won seventeen.

Henrique Capriles Radonski, the former mayor of the Baruta municipality, became the governor of Miranda, defeating the incumbent, Diosdado Cabello. Adán Chávez, president Hugo Chavéz's brother, became the governor of Barinas. In Carabobo, Henrique Salas Feo, the son of former presidential candidate Henrique Salas Römer, defeated his opponent Mario Silva to become the governor. Pablo Pérez Álvarez became the governor Zulia; he succeeded Manuel Rosales, who had governed from 2000 until 2008 and was a presidential candidate in 2006.

Background 
After losing the 2004 Venezuelan recall referendum, the opposition became determined to participate in the 2008 elections. Prior to the elections, the General Comptroller, a Chávez ally, banned almost 300 candidates who had been accused of corruption without making formal charges. Leopoldo López, a rising figure within the opposition who raised fears among the Chávez administration, was one of the hundreds of candidates barred from holding office. The Supreme Tribunal later ratified the bans and removed the candidates from the process.

Candidates
The following list shows the three main candidates according to their political affiliation (government, opposition and dissident or independent) ordered by number of votes attained. The political affiliation is determined by the political parties supporting each candidate. For the 2008 elections, government candidates were supported by the United Socialist Party; opposition candidates were supported by either Justice First, Democratic Action or the Political Electoral Independent Organization Committee parties; and independent candidates were mostly supported by regional parties.

Metropolitan mayors

Governors

Reception
According to the American think tank Freedom House, from this election forward Venezuela ceased to be an electoral democracy, in part due to the disqualification of hundreds of opposition candidates on corruption charges by stating that "the separation of powers is nearly nonexistent" in Venezuela. According to journalist Rory Carroll, Chávez anticipated that the disqualifications would divide the opposition, though the opposition unified instead. After opposition candidate Antonio Ledezma was elected mayor of the Metropolitan district of Caracas, colectivo leader and Chávez ally Lina Ron occupied Caracas' city hall with the support of authorities. Chávez would later establish a "capital district" that remove mayoral powers from Ledezma.

References
General

Specific

Further reading

2008 elections in South America
2008 in Venezuela
2008
November 2008 events in South America